The Colony and Protectorate of Kenya, commonly known as British Kenya or British East Africa, was part of the British Empire in Africa. It was established when the former East Africa Protectorate was transformed into a British Crown colony in 1920. Technically, the "Colony of Kenya" referred to the interior lands, while a 16 km (10 mi) coastal strip, nominally on lease from the Sultan of Zanzibar, was the "Protectorate of Kenya", but the two were controlled as a single administrative unit. The colony came to an end in 1963 when an ethnic Kenyan majority government was elected for the first time and eventually declared independence as the Republic of Kenya.

History
The Colony and Protectorate of Kenya was established on 23 July 1920 when the territories of the former East Africa Protectorate (except those parts of that Protectorate over which His Majesty the Sultan of Zanzibar had sovereignty) were annexed by the UK. The Kenya Protectorate was established on 29 November 1920 when the territories of the former East Africa Protectorate which were not annexed by the UK were established as a British Protectorate. The Protectorate of Kenya was governed as part of the Colony of Kenya by virtue of an agreement between the United Kingdom and the Sultan dated 14 December 1895.

In the 1920s, natives objected to the reservation of the White Highlands for Europeans, especially British war veterans. Bitterness grew between the natives and the Europeans. Describing the period in 1925, the African–American historian and Pan-Africanist W. E. B. Du Bois wrote in an article which would be incorporated into the pivotal Harlem Renaissance text The New Negro,

The population in 1921 was estimated at 2,376,000, of whom 9,651 were Europeans, 22,822 Indians and 10,102 Arabs. Mombasa, the largest city in 1921, had a population of 32,000 at that time.

The Mau Mau rebellion, a revolt against British colonial rule in Kenya, lasted from 1952 to 1960. The rebellion was marked by war crimes and massacres committed by both sides. 

The Colony and the Protectorate each came to an end on 12 December 1963. The United Kingdom ceded sovereignty over the Colony of Kenya and, under an agreement dated 8 October 1963, the Sultan agreed that simultaneous with independence for Kenya, the Sultan would cease to have sovereignty over the Protectorate of Kenya. In this way, Kenya became an independent country under the Kenya Independence Act 1963, which established the "Dominion of Kenya", with Queen Elizabeth II as head of state. Mzee Jomo Kenyatta was the first prime minister. On 26 May 1963, Kenya had its first elections and a new red, green, black and white flag was introduced. Exactly 12 months after the establishment of the Dominion, on 12 December 1964, Kenya became a republic under the name "Republic of Kenya".

Administration 
In 1948, the Kenyan government consisted of the Governor, the Executive Council advising him, and the Legislative Council. The Executive Council consisted of seven ex-officio members, two appointed Europeans, one appointed European representing African interests, and one appointed Asian (Indian). The Legislative Council consisted of 16 appointed officials and 22 elected unofficial members.

In 1954, the government was reformed to create a Council of Ministers as "the principal instrument of government." This council consisted of six official members from the civil service, two nominated members appointed by the governor, and six unofficial members appointed by the governor from among the members of the Legislative Council. Of the unofficial members, three were Europeans, two were Asian, and one was African.

The Executive Council continued in existence with all the members of the Council of Ministers also being members of the Executive Council. In addition, the Executive Council also included one Arab and two appointed Africans. The 
full Executive council retained certain prerogatives, including approving death sentences and reviewing draft legislation.

The Legislative Council in 1956 consisted of the Governor as president, a Speaker as vice-president and 56 members. Of the 56, eight sat ex-officio, 18 were appointed by the Governor and took the government whip, 14 were elected Europeans, six were elected Asians, one was an elected Arab, and eight were appointed Africans sitting on the non-government side. There was one appointed Arab sitting on the non-government side.

Military forces formed in the Colony and Protectorate from the 1880s included the East African Regiment which became the King's African Rifles; the East African Military Labour Service 1915–1918; the East African Mounted Rifles during the First World War 1914–17; the East African Ordnance Corps; the East African Pay Corps; the East African Pioneer Corps; three East African Reconnaissance Regiments; the East African Artillery the East African Road Construction Corps; the East African Scouts from March 1943, which served as 81st (West Africa) Division's reconnaissance unit in Burma; the East African Signal Corps; the East African Army Service Corps, expanded quickly at the start of the campaign against Italy in 1941 from 300 to 4,600; the East African Transport Corps; the Kenya Armoured Car Regiment; the Kenya Regiment of white settlers; the Kenya Defence Force, and the Kikuyu Guard during the Mau Mau Uprising.

Law
Corporal punishment, such as flogging, caning, and birching, was the primary legal punishment for many crimes used in colonial Kenya, particularly against young offenders. Though the metropolitan Colonial Office was sceptical of the use of such punishments, its unease did little to hinder their application by local authorities. Prisons were eschewed by most judges, due to the belief that it would erode the morality of convicts and consign them to a positive feedback loop of criminality. Corporal punishment was also used by government authorities against disobedient tribal chiefs, an example of this being the flogging of a Kikuyu chief by Colonel Algernon E. Capell after the latter was lied to by the former.

See also 
 Mau Mau rebellion (1952)

References

Further reading
 Kitching, Gavin N. Class and economic change in Kenya: The making of an African petite bourgeoisie 1905–1970 (Yale University Press, 1980)
 Lonsdale, John, and Bruce Berman. "Coping with the contradictions: the development of the colonial state in Kenya, 1895–1914." Journal of African History 20#04 (1979): 487–505.
 Mungeam, Gordon Hudson. British rule in Kenya, 1895–1912 (Oxford, Clarendon Press, 1966)
 Ochieng, William Robert. A history of Kenya (Macmillan Kenya, 1985)
 Ochieng, William Robert, and Robert M. Maxon, eds. An economic history of Kenya (East African Publishers, 1992)
 Wolff, Richard D. Britain and Kenya, 1870–1930: The Economics of Colonialism (Transafrica Publishers, 1974)

External links 
 The British Empire — Kenya

 Colony
Former British colonies and protectorates in Africa
East Africa
History of Kenya
.
.
.
.
1960s in Kenya
States and territories established in 1920
States and territories disestablished in 1963
.
.
1920 establishments in the British Empire
1963 disestablishments in the British Empire
Kenya–United Kingdom relations
Political history of Kenya
20th century in Kenya